He Wenna (born 1989-01-19 in Xinluo, Longyan, Fujian) is a female Chinese trampoline gymnast. She competed in the 2008 Summer Olympics, where she won the gold medal with a score of 37.80.

She won a gold medal in the team event at the 2007 Trampoline World Championships and 2009 Trampoline World Championships. In 2009, she also won a silver medal in Individual. In the 2011 Trampoline World Championships, she won both Team and Individual Gold medals and secured a place for China in the Olympics.

In the 2012 Summer Olympics, she was leading after the preliminary round but fell on her out bounce at the end of her routine and ended in third place.

References

 Team China page

External links
 
 
 

1989 births
Living people
Chinese female trampolinists
Gymnasts at the 2008 Summer Olympics
Gymnasts at the 2012 Summer Olympics
Gymnasts at the 2016 Summer Olympics
Olympic gold medalists for China
Olympic bronze medalists for China
Olympic gymnasts of China
People from Longyan
Hakka sportspeople
Olympic medalists in gymnastics
Gymnasts from Fujian
Medalists at the 2012 Summer Olympics
Medalists at the 2008 Summer Olympics
Asian Games medalists in gymnastics
Gymnasts at the 2010 Asian Games
Asian Games silver medalists for China
Medalists at the 2010 Asian Games
Medalists at the Trampoline Gymnastics World Championships
21st-century Chinese women